was a Japanese football player. He played for Japan national team.

Club career
Ukon was born in Sumiyoshi, Kobe on 23 September 1913. When he was a Keio University student, he won 1932 Emperor's Cup with Teiichi Matsumaru and so on as a member of Keio BRB was consisted of Keio University players and graduates. He also played for his local club Kobe Club. He played in many positions defender, midfielder and forward.

National team career

In May 1934, when Ukon was a Keio University student, he was selected Japan national team for 1934 Far Eastern Championship Games in Manila. At this competition, on 15 May, he debuted against Philippines. In 1936, he was also selected Japan for 1936 Summer Olympics in Berlin and scored a goal against Sweden. Japan completed a come-from-behind victory against Sweden. The first victory in Olympics for the Japan and the historic victory over one of the powerhouses became later known as "Miracle of Berlin" (ベルリンの奇跡) in Japan. In 2016, this team was selected Japan Football Hall of Fame. He played 5 games and scored 1 goal for Japan until 1940.

Death
In 1942, Ukon served in the military for World War II. In March 1944, he was killed in action in Bougainville Island, Papua New Guinea at the age of 30.

National team statistics

References

External links

 
 Japan National Football Team Database
Japan Football Hall of Fame (Japan team at 1936 Olympics) at Japan Football Association

1913 births
1944 deaths
Keio University alumni
Association football people from Hyōgo Prefecture
Japanese footballers
Japan international footballers
Olympic footballers of Japan
Footballers at the 1936 Summer Olympics
Japanese military personnel killed in World War II
Association football forwards